Live in the Classic City is the third live album released by Widespread Panic. The album was recorded over an April 2000 three-night run in their hometown of Athens, Georgia. It was released in June 2002 and features a mix of originals and cover songs, studded with guest performances from other star performers, including Derek Trucks, Bruce Hampton, and former R.E.M. drummer Bill Berry.

The collection revealed the full range of musical styles heard at a Widespread Panic show, from tight hook-laden songs to extended improvisational jams, with seven tracks breaking the ten-minute mark.

The album reached a peak position of #99 on both the Billboard 200 chart and the Top Internet Albums chart.

This album is one of 10 "live jam releases of this century" according to the August issue of Guitar One magazine.

Track listing

Disc one
"Action Man" (Widespread Panic) – 4:34
"Chilly Water" (Widespread Panic) – 4:02
"Pleas > Chilly Water" (Widespread Panic) – 12:05
"C Brown" (Widespread Panic) – 5:41
"Little Lily" (Widespread Panic) – 8:22
"I'm Not Alone" (Widespread Panic) – 6:09
"One Arm Steve" (Widespread Panic) – 3:33
"Flat Foot Flewzy" (Ferguson) – 5:43
"Surprise Valley" (Widespread Panic) – 7:08
"Blight" (Schools/Bell/Houser/Chesnutt) – 6:58
"Walkin" (Widespread Panic) – 4:56

Disc two
"All Time Low" (Widespread Panic) – 5:00
"Mercy" (Widespread Panic) – 9:07
"Ride Me High" (Cale) – 16:21
"Drums" (Widespread Panic) – 16:35
"Time Is Free" (Hampton/Johnson) – 11:39
"Climb to Safety" (Joseph) – 8:16
"Blue Indian" (Widespread Panic) – 5:39

Disc three
"Bear's Gone Fishin'" (Widespread Panic) – 6:21
"Waker" (Widespread Panic) – 3:57
"Dyin' Man" (Widespread Panic) – 4:29
"Stop and Go" (Widespread Panic) – 10:32
"Hatfield" (Widespread Panic) – 12:07
"Tall Boy" (Widespread Panic) – 6:01
"Red Hot Mama" (Clinton) – 5:48
"Worry" (Widespread Panic) – 10:51
"Let's Get the Show on the Road" (Stanley) – 7:34

Personnel
Widespread Panic
John Bell - Guitar, vocals
John Hermann - Keyboards, vocals
Michael Houser - Guitar, vocals
Todd Nance - Drums, vocals
Domingo S. Ortiz - Percussion
Dave Schools - Bass

Guest Performers
Randall Bramblett - Saxophone
Anne Richmond Boston - Vocals
Col. Bruce Hampton - Vocals
Pete Jackson -	Percussion
John Keane - Banjo, pedal Steel guitar
Chuck Leavell - Keyboards
Count Mbutu - Percussion
Yonrico Scott - Drums
Derek Trucks -	Guitar
Charlie Pruet - Percussion
Bill Berry - Percussion
Dr. Arvin Scott - Percussion
Garrie Vereen - Percussion

Production
John Keane - Producer, mixing
Billy Field - Engineer, mixing assistant
Ken Love - Mastering
Michael K. Sheehan - Photography

References

External links
Widespread Panic website
Everyday Companion
[ All Music entry]

Jammy Award winners
2002 live albums
Widespread Panic live albums
Albums produced by John Keane (record producer)